L.E.J. "Lilian" Janse-van der Weele (born 1973 in Vlissingen) is a Dutch politician who has become the first female representative of the Reformed Political Party (SGP) in an election. The Reformed Political Party did not allow women to run for office until an order by the European Court of Human Rights in 2012.

Since 27 March 2014 she has been a member of the municipal council of Vlissingen. Her election gained attention due to the party's history.

She is leading the SGP group (existing of two members) in the municipal council.

References

External links 
Lillian Janse's Twitter page (Dutch)
Councillor Janse-van der Weele, Municipality of Vlissingen (Dutch)

1973 births
Living people
21st-century Dutch politicians
21st-century Dutch women politicians
Dutch Calvinist and Reformed Christians
Municipal councillors in Zeeland
People from Vlissingen
Reformed Political Party politicians